The Eighth Extraordinary Session of the Islamic Summit Conference was a conference organized by the Organisation of Islamic Cooperation (OIC) in Islamabad on 17 December 2021.

Background 
The session was organized in the wake of the Afghan Taliban's takeover of Afghanistan following the Fall of Kabul, and the humanitarian and economic crisis which followed. USA and the European countries did not recognize the Taliban regime, and imposed strict economic sanctions on the Taliban, and had restricted access to Afghan assets and development funds worth billions of dollars.

These sanctions led to fears of an economic and humanitarian emergency in the country. In October 2021, the United Nations estimated that, based on reports by Food and Agriculture Organization and World Food Programme, around 22.8 million Afghans were in danger of being affected by food shortage and loss of livelihood.

It was held in Islamabad at the request of Saudi Arabia, which chaired the OIC.

See Also
Islamic Conference of Information Ministers

References

Organisation of Islamic Cooperation
2021 in international relations
2021 conferences
Diplomatic conferences in Pakistan
Islamic conferences